Józef Zając (born 14 March 1947 in Stany Nowe) is a Polish mathematician, academic teacher, and habilitated doctor of mathematical sciences. Zając is also a senator of the VIII, IX and X Senate of Poland. He is also a member of the  Agreement political party.

References 

1947 births
Living people
Members of the Senate of Poland 2019–2023
Members of the Senate of Poland 2015–2019
Members of the Senate of Poland 2011–2015
20th-century Polish mathematicians
21st-century Polish mathematicians
Rectors of universities in Poland
People from Janów Lubelski County